The 2013 League of Ireland Premier Division was the 29th season of the League of Ireland Premier Division. The division featured 12 teams. St. Patrick's Athletic were champions, winning their eighth top level League of Ireland title. Dundalk finished as runners-up.

Teams

Stadia and locations

Personnel and kits

Overview
The Premier Division featured 12 teams. Each team played each other three times, totalling 33 games. The regular season began on 8 March and concluded on 25 October. St. Patrick's Athletic clinched the title on 13 October 2013, with two games to go, after a 2–0 win against the holders, Sligo Rovers.

Final Table

Results

Matches 1–22

Matches 23–33

Promotion/relegation play-off
Bray Wanderers, the eleventh placed team from the Premier Division, played off against Longford Town, the winners of the 2013 First Division play off. The winner of this play off would play in the 2014 Premier Division.

Bray Wanderers win 5–4 on aggregate and retained their place in the Premier Division.

Goal scorers

Top scorers

Hat-tricks

Awards

Player of the Month

PFAI Players' Player of the Year

PFAI Young Player of the Year

Team of the Year

Television coverage
Live coverage of matches in Ireland were shown on RTÉ Two and Setanta Sports. MNS on RTÉ Two showed match highlights and analysis on each Monday night during the season.

See also
 2013 League of Ireland First Division
 2013 League of Ireland Cup

Notes

References

 
League of Ireland Premier Division seasons
1
1
Ireland
Ireland